Worth Dying For is the fifteenth book in the Jack Reacher series of thrillers written by Lee Child. It was published on 30 September 2010 in the United Kingdom and was published on 19 October 2010 in the USA. It is written in the third person.

Plot
Following the events of 61 Hours, Jack Reacher is on his way to Virginia to meet Major Susan Turner, the current commanding officer of his old Army unit, the 110th Military Police Unit. En route, he stops for the night at the Apollo Inn, a fading motel in rural Nebraska. In the motel's bar he overhears a drunken doctor refuse to take a house call for a woman named Eleanor Duncan, the abused wife of Seth Duncan, whose father and uncles run a trucking company that extorts business from surrounding farms. The Duncans employ ten ex-Nebraska Cornhusker offensive linemen as enforcers. Despite being warned that Eleanor is off-limits, Jack persuades the doctor to treat her nosebleed. He then tracks Seth to a local steakhouse, gives one of the Cornhuskers who is Seth's bodyguard a concussion, and breaks Seth's nose. The Duncans retaliate by sending two Cornhuskers to smash the doctor's car, and after Jack beats them up, the Duncans force the motel owner, Vincent, to throw Reacher out. 

Jack pretends to leave, but slips back into his room for the night. The next day, he meets Dorothy Coe, who works part-time as the maid. She takes Reacher to her house for breakfast, and reveals that the Duncans drove her family into poverty years ago after she accused them of kidnapping her daughter Margaret, leading her husband Arthur to commit suicide. Rossi, an Italian-American mobster who works with the Duncans, sends two men to help them find Jack, but he manages to evade them when they arrive at Dorothy's farm. Rossi's Arab contact Safir and his Iranian boss Mahmeni subsequently send four more men when it becomes clear that the Duncans are incapable of dealing with Reacher. However, they both instruct their men to kill the others when possible to eliminate their competition. Meanwhile, Reacher puts another Cornhusker out of commission who was trying to kill him with his truck. 

Visiting the local cops, Jack receives files from Margaret's disappearance, which seemingly clear the Duncans of any involvement. On his way back, he kills one of the Iranians, leading his partner to believe that he was murdered by the Italians. Reacher talks Eleanor into luring the lone Cornhusker who is guarding the road from town into following her. Reacher captures the Cornhusker, whose name is John, by parking his car across the road which forces John into a panic stop. Reacher takes John back to his living quarters, and challenges John to a fight. When John refuses to fight, Reacher tells John to stay out of the battle with the Duncans and takes his vehicle.  While Reacher is meeting with the doctor and Dorothy to discuss what he found, Seth and five Cornhuskers arrive, having forced Eleanor to reveal Jack's plan, and lock them inside, breaking Reacher's nose and throwing him in the basement. The Italians form an alliance with Safir's men to dispose of the other Iranian and cut his boss out of the plan, then shoot them dead and set fire to the bodies, which Vincent witnesses. 

Seth leaves, and Reacher manages to lure his two Cornhusker guards downstairs, where he subdues them, as well as two others when they arrive for breakfast. The last two Cornhuskers standing arrive next. One of them is the one who broke Reacher's nose. The other is John, which disappoints Reacher. Reacher forces the Cornhusker who broke his nose to immobilize John with duct tape. Reacher then challenges the Cornhusker to a fight, which Reacher wins easily, breaking the Cornhusker's nose in the process. The Italians kill the final Iranian as he interrogates the Duncans (having concluded that they murdered his partner after finding him in Seth's car) and leave to collect Reacher. After getting frustrated and stopping at Vincent's inn for the night, they are lured outside and killed by Reacher.

With the Duncans believing him to be dead, Jack makes his way to the old barn where Margaret was last seen, where he kills Eldrige Tyler, a friend of the Duncans guarding the barn who he fingers as her killer. Upon opening the barn and finding it full of decaying remains, he calls the townspeople over and reveals the truth: the Duncans have been engaging in human trafficking, bringing women and girls from Southeast Asia for the prostitution trade in Las Vegas. However, they also kept some of their cargo for purposes of sexual abuse, and Margaret, being adopted from Vietnam, was an easy target. 

Horrified, the doctor, his wife, and Dorothy agree to help Reacher exact revenge on the Duncans. Using vehicles to trap them inside their own compound, Jack kills Seth's uncles with a rifle, before running down and killing Seth himself. The doctor and his wife chase down Seth's father, and Dorothy kills him. Eleanor liberates a shipment of women that her family planned to send to Vegas, and informs Reacher that she will take the girls to Denver so they can assimilate into the Thai community there or try to get back home. Thankful that justice has been delivered, Reacher resumes his journey to find Maj. Turner.

Critical reception
 —Kirkus Reviews

References

External links

2010 British novels
English novels
Jack Reacher books
Novels set in Nebraska
Bantam Press books
Delacorte Press books